Carl James Prekopp (born 25 May 1979) is a British actor.

He played Richard III at the Riverside Studios (2010) and originated the part of Lawrence in Tim Firth's stage adaptation of Calendar Girls. Prekopp has appeared in BBC Radio 4 adaptations of Terry Pratchett's Mort (as the title character), Small Gods (as Brutha) and Night Watch (as young Sam Vimes). He directed the Afternoon Play Taken by Suzanne Heathcote for BBC Radio 4, and is a singer/songwriter and founding member of folk/rock band The Fircones featuring The Likely Lads actress Brigit Forsyth on cello.. In 2014, he voiced Lyman Lannister in the video game Game of Thrones. Since 2015, Prekopp has also been voicing the character of Bill Connolly in the audio drama series John Sinclair – Demon Hunter, which is based on the horror detective series of novels written by Helmut Rellergerd.

Prekopp was a supporting actor in the 2007 British feature film I Want Candy with Mackenzie Crook. He has also appeared in Law & Order: UK, Lewis, No Offence, Call the Midwife and Hard Sun. In 2015–16, Prekopp portrayed William III of England and Daniel Defoe in the Royal Shakespeare Company's production of Helen Edmundson's Queen Anne. In 2019, he appeared as Pat in the British psychological horror film Saint Maud.

Radio

References

1979 births
Living people
British male radio actors